Events in the year 1942 in India.

Incumbents 
 Emperor of India – George VI
 Viceroy of India – Victor Hope, 2nd Marquess of Linlithgow

Events 
 National income - 56,597 million
 February – Visit of Generalissimo Chiang Kai Shek of China (Commander of Allied forces for Asia  China sector) amidst impending pressure of Japanese attack on Burma. Meets Congress top leaders to seek India's participation in war.
 8 Mar – Japanese army enters Rangoon. British necessity to break Indian political deadlock.
 22 Mar – Arrival of The Cripps mission, proposals /declaration made public on 30 Mar but are rejected by Congress and all other parties except Muslim League.
 14 July- Wardha working committee meeting reiterated demand for Britons leaving India.
 8 August – Quit India resolution was passed by the Bombay session of the AICC, which led to the start of a historical civil disobedience movement across India.
 9 August – Indian leader, Mohandas Gandhi is arrested in Bombay by British forces.
 August – Newly married couple Indira Gandhi and Feroze Gandhi are arrested for their participation in Quit India movement.
 16 October – Hurricane and flooding in Bombay: 40,000 dead.
 December – Many demonstrators were lathi-charged and assassinated. By December, over 60,000 people had been jailed.
Formation of INA

Law 
Coffee Market Expansion Act

Births 
13 January – Yogesh Kumar Sabharwal, Chief Justice of India (died 2015).
10 February – Madhabi Mukherjee, actress.
21 February – Jayshree Gadkar, actress (died 2008).
11 March – Amarinder Singh, politician and current Chief Minister of Punjab.
2 April – Roshan Seth, actor.
7 April – Jitendra, Actor , Jeetendra
15 April – Madhur Kapila, novelist,  journalist and art critic (died 2021)
25 May – Dr. Sri Ganapathy Sachchidananda Swamiji
19 August – Bungle Shama Rao Dwarakanath, actor.
20 September – Rajinder Goel, cricketer (d. 2020)
2 October – Asha Parekh, actress, director and producer.
11 October – Amitabh Bachchan, actor.
26 October – Roger Bhatnagar, Indian-born New Zealand businessman (died 2022)
18 December – Jagdish Khattar, businessman and civil servant (died 2021)
29 December – Rajesh Khanna, actor. (died 2012).

Deaths 
24 April – Deenanath Mangeshkar, actor, musician and singer (born 1900).

References 

 
India
Years of the 20th century in India
India in World War II